The Patriarchate Court is a listed historical building which was the seat of the Patriarchate of Karlovci between 1848 and 1920, in Sremski Karlovci, Serbia.

History
The palace was built between 1892 and 1895 as a project of Serbian architect Vladimir Nikolić on the site of the old "Pasha's Konak". The "Pasha's Konak" was the first residence of the head of the Serbian Orthodox Church after transferring from the Archbishopric of Peć to Sremski Karlovci. Metropolitan Stefan Stratimirović established a fund in 1817 to raise money for the construction of the palace, which was built during the reign of Metropolitan Georgije II Branković. 

Construction of the palace was chosen to be in the style of Italian palaces, and the project was entrusted to contractors Peklo Bela and Karlo Lerer. The Royal Chapel the story above the main entrance was painted by Uroš Predić, and is covered by a hemisphere dome and is topped with a Lantern. The basis of the palace is in the form of the Cyrillic letter S, with the porte-cochère in the middle. The main facade has a forward side with Rizal emphasized in the level of the first-floor columns, pilasters, and the amount of columns is symbolic also of the amount of Attica architrave triangular ends, with the central Rizal highlighted with three windows that are bigger than others, and a terrace and front entrance where the stairs to the side of stone sculptures set of two lions. In total, there is a series of seventeen window openings with semicircular endings. The windows gives rhythm and uniformity, and alongside shallow pilasters with Ionic consoles and rails under the window of mass, gives cheerfulness. The central rizal is highlighted on the roofs top observation post. The Patriarchal Court is not only the historic administrative seat of the Serbian Orthodox Church, but also houses the Church Museum with treasures such as stored valuables, works of art, icons, portraits of the major metropolitan and church dignitaries, different objects of applied arts and a library of rare valuable manuscripts and old printed books. Within the palace, a treasury is open to the public with a permanent display of objects from the eighteenth and nineteenth century from the destroyed churches in Bosnia and Croatia. The complex is surrounded by a high fence, combining bricks and cast iron.

Modern Day

Today, the building is a permanent residence of the Bishop of Srem and a summer residence of Serbian Patriarch and also home to the Museum of the Serbian Orthodox Church. The building and the park is immaculately maintained. Palace is a monument of exceptional importance, and on the list of the Monument of Culture of Exceptional Importance.

See also

 Patriarchate of Karlovci
 Sremski Karlovci
Monument of Culture of Exceptional Importance
Tourism in Serbia

References

Cultural Monuments of Exceptional Importance (Serbia)
Serbian Orthodox church buildings in Serbia
Buildings and structures in Sremski Karlovci
Episcopal palaces
Palaces in Serbia
Neoclassical palaces
History of the Serbian Orthodox Church
Office buildings in Serbia